Lirim Kastrati (born 2 February 1999), also known as Lirim R. Kastrati, is a Kosovan professional footballer who plays as a centre-back for Hungarian club Újpest and the Kosovo national team.

Club career

Youth career

Bologna
On 23 July 2018, Kastrati signed a three-year contract with Campionato Primavera 2 club Bologna. On 15 September 2018, he made his debut in a 1–1 home draw against SPAL after being named in the starting line-up.

Újpest
On 22 July 2020, Kastrati signed his first professional contract with Nemzeti Bajnokság I side Újpest after agreeing to a four-year deal and receiving squad number 62. On 15 August 2020, he was named as a Újpest substitute for the first time in a Nemzeti Bajnokság I match against Paksi. His debut with Újpest came eight days later against Budafoki MTE after being named in the starting line-up, and assists in his side's only goal during a 1–1 home draw.

International career

Albania

Under-17
On 16 October 2015, Kastrati was named as part of the Albania U17 squad for 2016 UEFA European Under-17 Championship qualification. On 22 October 2015, he made his debut with Albania U17 in a match against Switzerland U17 after being named in the starting line-up.

Kosovo

First call-up
On 21 March 2017, Kastrati received first call-up from Kosovo U21 for a 2019 UEFA European Under-21 Championship qualification match against Republic of Ireland U21, he was an unused substitute in that match.

Promotion to the senior team
On 5 June 2017, Kastrati received a call-up from Kosovo for a 2018 FIFA World Cup qualification match against Turkey. On 9 October 2017, he made his debut with Kosovo in a 2018 FIFA World Cup qualification match against Iceland after coming on as a substitute at 78th minute in place of Besar Halimi.

Return to youth teams

Under-19
On 17 March 2018, Kastrati was named as part of the Kosovo U19 squad for 2018 UEFA European Under-19 Championship elite qualifications. On 21 March 2018, he made his debut with Kosovo U19 in a match against Portugal U19 after being named in the starting line-up.

Under-21
On 27 May 2019, Kastrati returns to Kosovo U21, where call-up for 2021 UEFA European Under-21 Championship qualification matches against Andorra U21 and Turkey U21. On 6 June 2019, he made his debut with Kosovo U21 in a match against Andorra U21 after being named in the starting line-up.

References

External links

1999 births
Living people
People from Mališevo
Kosovo Albanians
Association football fullbacks
Kosovan footballers
Kosovo youth international footballers
Kosovo under-21 international footballers
Kosovo international footballers
Kosovan expatriate footballers
Kosovan expatriate sportspeople in Italy
Kosovan expatriate sportspeople in Hungary
Albanian footballers
Albania youth international footballers
Albanian expatriate footballers
Albanian expatriate sportspeople in Italy
Albanian expatriate sportspeople in Hungary
Nemzeti Bajnokság I players
Újpest FC players
Expatriate footballers in Hungary